Hajji Mohammad Gul was elected to the Helmand Provincial Council in 2005.

References

People from Helmand Province
Living people
Afghan politicians
Year of birth missing (living people)